The 2019 Katsina State gubernatorial election occurred in Nigeria on 9 March 2019. Incumbent APC Governor Aminu Bello Masari won re-election for a second term, defeating PDP Garba Yakubu Lado and 16 other party candidates.

Aminu Bello Masari emerged APC gubernatorial candidate after scoring 5,562 votes and defeating his closest rival, Abubakar Isa, who received 8 votes. He picked Mannir Yakubu as his running mate. Garba Yakubu Lado was the PDP candidate with Salisu Yusuf Majigiri as his running mate. 18 candidates contested in the election.

Electoral system
The Governor of Katsina State is elected using the plurality voting system.

Primary election

APC primary
The APC primary election was held on September 30, 2018. Aminu Bello Masari won the primary election polling 5,562 votes against 2 other candidates. His closest rival was Abubakar Isa, an accomplished businessman who came second with 8 votes, while Garba Dankani came third with 1 vote.

Candidates
Party nominee: Aminu Bello Masari: Incumbent governor of the state
Running mate: Mannir Yakubu:  A politician and surveyor
Abubakar Isa: An accomplished businessman
Garba Dankani

PDP primary
The PDP primary election was held on September 30, 2018. Garba Yakubu Lado won the primary election polling 3,385 votes against 5 other candidates. His closest rival was Ahmad Yar’adua who came second with 243 votes, Abdullahi Faskari, the state's former deputy governor and Musa Nashuni, a former PDP gubernatorial candidate in 2015 had only one vote each.

Candidates
Party nominee: Garba Yakubu Lado: A former Senator representing Katsina South senatorial district 
Running mate: Salisu Yusuf Majigiri
Ahmad Yar’adua
Abdullahi Faskari: The state's former deputy governor
Musa Nashuni: Former PDP gubernatorial candidate in 2015
Umar Tata
Sada Olu

Results
A total number of 18 candidates registered with the Independent National Electoral Commission to contest in the election.

The total number of registered voters in the state was 3,230,230, while 1,173,780 voters were accredited. Total number of votes cast was 1,720,638, while number of valid votes was 1,683,045. Rejected votes were 37,593.

By local government area
Here are the results of the election by local government area for the two major parties. The total valid votes of 1,683,045 represents the 18 political parties that participated in the election. Blue represents LGAs won by Aminu Bello Masari Green represents LGAs won by Garba Yakubu Lado.

References 

Katsina State gubernatorial election
Katsina State gubernatorial election
Katsina State gubernatorial elections